AGSA may refer to

The Department for Safeguarding the Interests of Afghanistan, now named KHAD (Khadamat-e Aetla'at-e Dawlati)
The Alliance of Girls' Schools Australasia 
Andrade Gutierrez S.A., a Brazilian private conglomerate 
The Art Gallery of South Australia
The Auditor General of South Africa